The 1977–78 season was FC Dinamo București's 29th season in Divizia A. Dinamo lost Radu Nunweiller and Mircea Lucescu who both went to Corvinul Hunedoara. Because of these losses, Dinamo could not fight for the championship, and finished only fifth. In the European Cup, Dinamo wins a thrilling game against Atlético Madrid 2–1, but loses in Madrid, 2–0.

Results

European Cup 

First round

Atlético Madrid won 3-2 on aggregate

Squad 

Goalkeepers: Constantin Eftimescu, Constantin Traian Ștefan.

Defenders: Florin Cheran, Vasile Dobrău, Teodor Lucuță, Gabriel Sandu, Alexandru Sătmăreanu.

Midfielders: Alexandru Custov, Cornel Dinu, Ion Marin, Ion Mateescu, Ion Moldovan.

Forwards: Ionel Augustin, Vasile Chitaru, Dudu Georgescu, Sorin Georgescu, Alexandru Moldovan, Adalbert Rozsnyai, Cornel Țălnar, Cristian Vrînceanu.

References 
 www.labtof.ro
 www.romaniansoccer.ro

1977
Association football clubs 1977–78 season
Dinamo